The Portsmouth Cobblers were a minor league baseball team based in Portsmouth, Ohio. From 1908 to 1915, the Cobblers played exclusively as members of the Class D level Ohio State League, winning league championships in 1910, 1912, 1914 and 1915. The Cobblers hosted home games at Millbrook Park and were immediately succeeded by the 1916 Portsmouth Truckers who won the Ohio State League championship. The "Cobblers" nickname was in reference to the large shoe industry in Portsmouth in the era. In 1913, Portsmouth hosted an exhibition game against the Chicago Cubs.

Baseball Hall of Fame member Billy Southworth began his professional career with the 1912 and 1913 Cobblers.

History
In 1868 the "Riverside club" baseball amateur team was formed. The Cobblers were preceded in minor league baseball by the 1884 Portsmouth Riversides, who played the season as members of the Ohio State League under manager Daniel Spry.

In 1909, Portsmouth gained a franchise in the middle of the Ohio State League season. On June 16, 1908, the Springfield Reapers franchise moved to Portsmouth. Springfield had a 17–30 record at the time of the move. Portsmouth joined the Lancaster Lanks, Lima Cigarmakers, Mansfield Pioneers, Marion Diggers and Newark Newks in Ohio State League play, which began scheduled games on April 23, 1908.

Portsmouth was once known as "The Shoe Capital of the World" and the Portsmouth use of the "Cobblers" nickname for the team corresponded to the large shoe industry in Portsmouth in the era, with numerous shoe manufacturing companies based in Portsmouth.

Finishing the 1908 season with a 29–73 record after being based in Portsmouth, the Springfield/Portsmouth "Cobblers" finished last in the Ohio State League final standings. The team ended the 1908 season with an overall record of 46–103, as Ned Ransick and R. Quinn served as managers. The Cobblers finished the season 46.0 games behind 1st place Lancaster.

In their second season of play, the Portsmouth Cobblers placed 4th in the six–team Ohio State League standings. The Cobblers ended the 1909 season with a record of 48–76, as Jack McCallister, Billy Doyle, and Charley O'Day served as managers during the season.

In 1910, the Portsmouth Cobblers won their first Ohio State League championship. The Cobblers ended the 1910 season with a record of 86-52, placing 1st in the Ohio State League standings as Pete Childs served as manager, a position he would hold for five seasons. Portsmouth finished 4.0 games ahead of the 2nd place Lima Cigar Makers in the six–team league. Portsmouth's Frank O'Day won the Ohio State League batting championship, hitting .324. 1910 Portsmouth player Ed Irwin died in 1916. Irwin was killed as a result of being thrown through a saloon window in Philadelphia, as a shard of glass penetrated his jugular vein.

On June 18, 1910, Portsmouth player/manager Pete Childs threw a one–pitch triple play. Portsmouth was losing to the 7–3 to the Marion Diggers in the bottom of the 8th inning. Player\manager Childs put himself in to pitch with the bases loaded and 0 outs, replacing Frank Harter. The Marion batter hit Childs' first pitch to the fence in center field, where it was caught by Frank O'Day, with the three base runners all running on the play. O'Day then threw to the cutoff man and runners were forced out at 1st base and 2nd base to complete the triple play.

The Cobblers ended the 1911 season with a record of 78–61, placing 3rd in the standings. Pete Childs served as manager. Portsmouth finished 6.0 games behind the 1st place Springfield Reapers in the final standings, as the Ohio State League expanded to eight teams.

The Portsmouth Cobblers won their second Ohio State League championship in 1912. The Cobblers ended the 1912 season with an overall record of 81–52, with Pete Childs served as manager. Portsmouth won both half–seasons of the eight–team 1912 Ohio State League.

At age 19, Baseball Hall of Fame member Billy Southworth began his professional career with the 1912 Cobblers. Southworth hit .278 playing in 134 games for Portsmouth. Southworth had been a catcher, but was switched to outfield when Portsmouth already had two catchers on their roster.

On September 23, 1913, Portsmouth hosted an exhibition game against the Chicago Cubs. Portsmouth native Al Bridwell was playing shortstop for the Cubs. The day was proclaimed to be, "Al Bridwell Day" in Portsmouth.

Continuing Ohio State League play in 1913, the Cobblers placed 3rd in the eight–team league, finishing with a record of 83–55 under returning manager Pete Childs Portsmouth finished 3.0 games behind the 1st place Chillicothe Babes in the final standings. Ed Donalds had a 30–8 record pitching record for the Cobblers, leading the Ohio State League in wins. Billy Southworth began the 1913 season with Portsmouth, hitting .310 in 77 games before being promoted to the Toledo Mud Hens. Southworth ended the 1913 season in the major leagues with the Cleveland Naps.

The 1914 Portsmouth Cobblers won their third Ohio State League championship. Ending the 1914 season with a record of 86–53, the Cobblers finished 1st in the eight-team Ohio State League standings as Pete Childs served his final season as the Portsmouth manager. The Cobblers finished 8.0 games ahead of the 2nd place Charleston Senators in the final standings. Paul Carter of Portsmouth led the league in wins with 22.

In their final season of play, the 1915 Portsmouth Cobblers defended their championship under a new manager and won their fourth league title. Chet Spencer served as manager as the Portsmouth Cobblers of the Ohio State League ended the 1915 season with a record of 71–42, to win the league pennant and the first–half title. In the playoffs the Cobblers defeated the Maysville Angels, winners of the second–half title, 4 games to 1 to win the championship. Portsmouth's Ralph Sharman led the league in hitting, batting .374.

Portsmouth continued Ohio State League play in 1916 under a different nickname and won a fifth Ohio State League title for Portsmouth. The Portsmouth Truckers won the 1916 Ohio State League championship under returning manager Chet Spencer.

The ballpark
The Portsmouth Cobblers and Portsmouth Truckers hosted home minor league home games at Millbrook Park. Millbrook Park was completed in 1902 and was prone to flooding, closing in 1937. The park was located adjacent to a steel mill in New Boston, Ohio, the adjacent village to Portsmouth. The amusement park had streetcar service and amenities that included the ballfield, a roller coaster, carousel, pavilion, a concert pavilion called "The Casino" and lakes for boating and ice skating. The ballpark had a covered grandstand.

Timeline

Year–by–year record

Notable alumni

Baseball Hall of Fame alumni
Billy Southworth (1912–1913) Inducted, 2008

Notable alumni
Harry Blake (1909)
Jack Bushelman (1908)
Paul Carter (1914)
Howdy Caton (1914)
Pete Childs (1910–1914, MGR)
Ed Conwell (1909–1914)
Cal Crum (1914)
Pickles Dillhoefer (1914–1915)
Ed Donalds (1912–1913)
Frank Emmer (1915)
Frank Harter (1910–1912)
Ed Irwin (1910)
Bill Jackson (1909)
Larry Jacobus (1915)
Bill Jones (1910)
Sad Sam Jones (1914)
Tacks Latimer (1908)
Rube Marshall (1912)
Jack McCallister (1909, MGR)
Alex McColl (1915)
Austin McHenry (1915)
Jack Mercer (1908)
Frank Mills (1915)
Frank Moore (1910–1911)
John Potts (1911)
Ralph Sharman (1915)
Chet Spencer (1908–1909), (1915, MGR)
Al Tedrow (1914)

See also
Portsmouth Cobblers players

References

External links
 Baseball Reference
 Millbrook Park postcard
 Millbrook ballpark photo
 1910 Portsmouth team photo

Defunct minor league baseball teams
Professional baseball teams in Ohio
Defunct baseball teams in Ohio
Baseball teams established in 1908
Baseball teams disestablished in 1915
Ohio State League teams
Portsmouth, Ohio